Fony may refer to:
Fony, Hungary, a small village in Hungary
Suck Fony, a 2005 album by Wheatus
Fony, a record label founded by composer John Oswald